The End of Oil: On the Edge of a Perilous New World is a non-fiction book by American journalist and author Paul Roberts. Published in 2004, it is Roberts' book-length debut. It provides an analysis of the various problems associated with humanity's reliance on oil and other fossil fuels such as coal and natural gas.

Synopsis 
Though The End of Oil is not a chronological history of humanity's use of fossil fuels, Roberts begins by recounting how Thomas Newcomen, in 1712, presented the first large steam engine, and thus helped spark the Industrial Revolution. He then goes on to explain the problems that have since developed, or may develop in the future, from humanity's reliance on oil and its "geological siblings", coal and natural gas. While there is a chapter on hydrogen as a possible alternative to oil (not as an energy source, but as an energy carrier), the book is not focused on any one solution to the problems it lays out.

According to Roberts, oil faces three major dilemmas. Most importantly, all fossil fuels are by their very nature limited in supply; as far as oil is concerned, the resulting dilemma is best known as the question of peak oil. Further, much of the oil consumed by affluent countries such as the United States is extracted in countries that are rather unstable politically, such as some of the members of the OPEC. The oil trade is therefore prone to become intertwined with international relations, although the nature of this interplay is highly controversial, with some citing oil as a reason for conflicts such as the Iraq War and others denying such claims. Finally, since the burning of fossil fuels releases carbon dioxide that was previously locked in the ground, humanity's reliance on oil may contribute to global warming.

As to the aims of the book, Roberts states at the end of the prologue:

Predictions for the price of oil
At various points in the book, Roberts makes cautious predictions for the price of oil. These were soon proved to be, if anything, too optimistic. For example, citing Arab Oil and Gas magazine as a source, Roberts wrote that "in the next five to ten years", if there were to be any large disruption in supply, "prices could easily be bid up past sixty dollars a barrel and kept there for months". In fact, prices passed the sixty-dollar mark as early as June 2005, 
thirteen months after the book was first published.

However, by 2009, oil prices had fallen back under the sixty-dollar mark.

Reception 

The End of Oil received a number of positive reviews from American newspapers and review publications. Notably, environmentalist Bill McKibben, in an article for the New York Review of Books, described it as "perhaps the best single book ever produced about our energy economy and its environmental implications." 
Fellow author Joseph J. Romm, whose The Hype about Hydrogen had been published a few weeks before The End of Oil, called the book "fascinating" and "a stinging rebuke of America's myopic, do-nothing energy policy." In 2005, it was a finalist for the New York Public Library's Helen Bernstein Book Award.

Editions

References

External links
 Interview with Roberts about The End of Oil at National Public Radio on May 6, 2004 (audio)
 The True Debate about Energy: When Oil Runs Out...

2004 non-fiction books
2004 in the environment
American non-fiction books
Houghton Mifflin books
Peak oil books